Archibald House is the name of several buildings. 

It may refer to:

Canada
 Archibald House, Moncton, New Brunswick, Canada; former site of the Moncton Public Library
 Leonard Carey Archibald House, Antigonish County, Nova Scotia, Canada; see List of historic places in Antigonish County, Nova Scotia
 Archibald House, several buildings in Colchester County, Nova Scotia, Canada; see List of historic places in Colchester County, Nova Scotia

UK
 Archibald House, BBC Drama Village, Selly Oaks, University of Birmingham, Birmingham, England, UK
 Archibald House, Elie, Fife, Scotland, UK; see List of listed buildings in Elie and Earlsferry, Fife

USA
 Archibald House, Brown University, Providence, Rhode Island, USA; see List of Brown University buildings
 Edward T. Archibald House, Rice County, Dundas, Minnesota, USA; an NRHP-listed farmhouse
 Archibald-Adams House (originally Archibald House), Cherryfield, Maine, USA; an NRHP-listed house
 Archibald-Vroom House (originally Archibald House), Ridgewood, New Jersey, USA; an NRHP-listed building

See also
  Search: archibald house